The Adventures of Greyfriars Bobby is a family-based Scottish film released in the US in 2005 (as Greyfriars Bobby) and the UK in 2006, and directed by John Henderson. It is set in Edinburgh, Scotland, and tells the story of a Skye terrier called Bobby, who will not leave his master's grave after his death. The dog faces many perils because of this, and has to endure much in his struggle to be allowed to live his life. The film is loosely based on a real dog known as Greyfriars Bobby.

Plot
John Gray, the local policeman, owns Bobby the Westie, but allows a shy boy called Ewan to befriend his dog. When Gray dies and is buried in the Greyfriars Kirkyard, the dog will not leave the grave, despite his fondness for Ewan. The Greyfriars gravedigger, James Brown, takes a liking to Bobby, and gives him food and protection. However, the passing of a new dog law in Scotland threatens Bobby's very existence, and Ewan must do everything in his power to save his canine friend, even when it involves the Lord Provost of Edinburgh.

Cast
 James Cosmo as James Brown, gravedigger
 Oliver Golding as Ewan Adams
 Gina McKee as Maureen Gray
 Sean Pertwee as Duncan Smithie
 Christie Mitchell as Mary McPherson
 Greg Wise as Minister Lee
 Thomas Lockyer as John Gray
 Christopher Lee as The Lord Provost
 Ronald Pickup as Cecil Johnson
 Ian Richardson as The Judge
 Ardal O'Hanlon as Coconut Tam
 Kirsty Mitchell as Ada Adams

Production
Greyfriars Bobby was played by a West Highland White Terrier, when the original dog was in fact a Skye Terrier. This casting caused protests from the Skye Terrier breed club, who complained about filmmakers using an incorrect dog breed. Christopher Figg, the producer, said that a Westie was used "because its white coat would stand out in the dark and because its eyes would not be hidden from the camera by a fringe." During the early stages of planning for this film in 2003, Scottish Screen, the national development agency for the Scottish screen industries, had run a lottery worth £500,000, but withdrew the funding for the film, and it was almost made in Luxembourg instead of Scotland. While Bakehouse Close, off the Royal Mile, was used for the exterior shots of John Gray's family home, the Edinburgh Castle scenes in this film were actually shot in Stirling Castle. There was much filming in and around the old town of Stirling as well as within the grounds of Stirling Castle doubling for old Edinburgh and Greyfriars Kirk Yard as seen in the film is in fact Stirling's Old Town Cemetery with the Church of The Holy Rood in the background.

See also
Greyfriars Bobby (1961 film)

References

External links
Official website

2005 films
British historical films
2000s historical films
Films about dogs
Films set in Scotland
Films set in Edinburgh
Films set in the 1850s
Films set in the 1860s
Films set in the 1870s
Greyfriars Bobby
Films shot in Edinburgh
Films directed by John Henderson (director)
2000s English-language films
2000s British films